A Candidate of Sciences is the first of two doctoral level scientific degrees in Russia and the Commonwealth of Independent States. It is formally classified as UNESCO's ISCED level 8, "doctoral or equivalent." It may be recognized as a Doctor of Philosophy, usually in natural sciences, by scientific institutions in other countries. Former Soviet countries also have a more advanced degree, Doctor of Sciences.

Overview
The degree was introduced in the USSR on 13 January 1934 by a decision of the Council of People's Commissars of the USSR, all previous degrees, ranks and titles having been abolished immediately after the October Revolution in 1917. Academic distinctions and ranks were viewed as survivals of capitalist inequality and hence were to be permanently eliminated. The original decree also recognized some degrees earned prior to 1917 in Tsarist Russia and elsewhere.

To attain the Candidate of Sciences degree, an individual must hold a Master's (Magistr) or a Specialist diploma, both one or (more typically) two year degrees in this system. Both of these prerequisites are post-bachelors (Bakalavr) degrees, bachelor's being four years of full-time study. The Candidate of Sciences degree requires a minimum of three years of full-time study during which the individual must conduct and publish advanced original research into a topic that is deemed significant or has practical economic or military potential.

In order to attain the rank of full Professor in these countries, a Doctor of Sciences degree is required in the same way that habilitation is required in Germany. This is also sometimes the case in the United States and the United Kingdom, where in addition to the possession of a doctoral degree, some volume of further research must be demonstrated.

Procedure for attaining the degree
The work on a dissertation is commonly carried out during a postgraduate study period called aspirantura. It is performed either within an educational institution (such as a university) or a scientific research institution (such as an institute of the Russian Academy of Sciences network). It can also be carried out without a direct connection to the academy. In exceptional cases, the Candidate of Sciences degree may be awarded on the basis of published scholarly works without writing a thesis. In experimental sciences the dissertation is based on an independent research project conducted under  the supervision of a professor, the results of which must be published in at least three papers in peer-review scientific journals.

A necessary prerequisite is taking courses in philosophy and foreign language, and passing a qualifying examination called "candidate minimum". In the Soviet Union, the candidate minimum included exams in the specialty field of the "dissertant", in a foreign language of his/her choice and in scientific communism. In post-Soviet Russia and other post-Soviet states, the latter examination was replaced by the one in philosophy, and in Russia recently in the history and philosophy of science; in Ukraine it is still philosophy.

The dissertation is presented ("defended") before a committee called the Dissertation Council which is accredited at the educational or scientific institution. The Council consists of about 20 members, who are the leading specialists (including the academicians) in the field of the dissertation and who have been selected and empowered to serve for the council. The summary of the dissertation must be published before public defense in the form of "autoreferat" in about 150–200 copies, and distributed to major research organizations and libraries. The seeker of the degree must have an official "research supervisor". The dissertation must be delivered together with official references of several reviewers, called "opponents". In a procedure called the "defense of the dissertation" the dissertation is summarized before the commission, followed by speeches by the opponents or the reading of their references, and replies to the comments of the opponents and question of the Commission members by the aspirant.

If the defense is successful (66.6%  majority of votes by the secret ballot voting by the members of the council), it is recommended and later must be approved by the central statewide board called Higher Attestation Commission or "Vysshaya attestacionnaya komissiya" or VAK (or by similar authority in other applicable countries). However, since end-2010s the dissertation councils accredited at some world-known educational units like Moscow and St.Petersburg State universities or top-level research centers are exempt from requirement to send the defended dissertations to the VAK for control. As of 2021 there were 29 such organizations (s. full list).

Local characteristics

Former Czechoslovakia
In Czechoslovakia, the Candidate and Doctor of Sciences degrees were modeled precisely after the Soviet one by Law 60/1953 in 1953. Requirements to attain the degree were thus literally the same as in the USSR. Since all Czechoslovak top academic research institutions were dissolved after the Communist Putsch in 1948, the supreme academic authority was represented by the Czechoslovak Academy of Sciences, newly established in 1953. The degree could also be awarded by the Slovak Academy of Sciences and universities.

The abbreviation of the degree is CSc., added behind the bearer's name and a comma.

There also have been other academic degrees in Czechoslovakia and its successional states, that incorporate the "Dr." abbreviation, e.g.
 JUDr.
 PhDr.
 RNDr.
and others. These doctor degrees are not to be confused with a Ph.D., although its holders are addressed "doctor". Applicants need a master's degree (5 years +) or a comparable degree with excellent grades. This degree is stated before names and awarded after writing a rigorous thesis of 50.000 to 80.000 words and defending it at a viva voce and (rigorous) exam in at least 2-3 related fields of doctoral studies.

 MUDr. is a "Doctor of Medicine" degree equivalent to the North-American MD, attained after 6-year university studies.
 MVDr. is a "Doctor of Veterinary" akin to DVM.
 RSDr. was a quasi-degree, awarded exclusively to functionaries of the Communist Party of Czechoslovakia (KSČ) during the Communist era, who either or not "graduated" from the Political College of the Central Committee of the Communist Party of Czechoslovakia. The leading subject taught was Marxism-Leninism and there was no need to have completed even a secondary school to attain the degree. RSDr. was also possible to attain at some military universities, however, contrary to the previous case, the applicant had to pass further exams.

Czech Republic
Granting CSc. was abolished in 1998 and replaced with Ph.D. or Th.D. An applicant is required to have master's degree (or its equivalent, e.g. Engineer (Ing.) in technical and economic university programs or Doctor of Medicine (MUDr.), Doctor of Veterinary Medicine (MVDr.) in medical university programs), enroll in an approximately three-year post-graduate program and defend their dissertation before a panel of expert examiners appointed by the university.

Slovakia

Candidate was abolished in 1996 and replaced with PhD. (in 1996-2002 officially in Latin: philosophiae doctor). Requirements are similar to the Czech system.

Poland
Since the medieval period, Polish tradition was to call Ph.D. equivalent as "doktor". Only for a short period of time between 1951 and 1958 the communist government tried to replace the title of "doktor" with "kandydat nauk" to follow the Soviet model.

Former Soviet Union, Russia, Ukraine, Belarus

In the USSR, there was required at least three original scientific papers published and/or submitted. At least one paper should be in one of the journals listed by the Higher Assessment Commission (VAK) of the Russian Ministry of Science. In Belarus and Ukraine now, all the three publications have to be published in the journals listed by the VAK.

In 1971, there were 249,200 scientists holding the Candidate degree.

According to "Guidelines for the recognition of Russian qualifications in the other countries" , in countries with a two-tier system of doctoral degrees, the degree of Candidate of Sciences should be considered for recognition at the level of the first doctoral degree. In countries with only one doctoral degree, the degree of Candidate of Sciences should be considered for recognition as equivalent to this degree.

Ukraine 
In 2014, with the adoption of the new Law of Ukraine "On Higher Education", the degree of Candidate of Sciences was abolished and equated to the degree of Doctor of Philosophy.

Branches of science
Depending on the specialty of research in the dissertation, a candidate is awarded one of the following degrees:
 agricultural sciences (abbr.: к. с.-х. н.);
 architecture (abbr.: к. арх.);
 art criticism (abbr.: к. иск.);
 biological sciences (abbr.: к. б. н.);
 chemical sciences (abbr.: к. х. н.);
 culturology (abbr.: к. культ.);
 economic sciences (abbr.: к. э. н.);
 engineering sciences (abbr.: к. т. н.);
 geographic sciences (abbr.: к. геогр. н.);
 geologo-mineralogical sciences (abbr.: к. г.-м. н.);
 historical sciences (abbr.: к. ист. н.);
 juridical sciences (abbr.: к. ю. н.);
 medical sciences (abbr.: к. м. н.);
 military sciences (abbr.: к. воен. н.);
 pedagogic sciences (abbr.: к. пед. н.);
 pharmaceutical sciences (abbr.: к. фарм. н.);
 philological sciences (abbr.: к. филол. н.);
 philosophical sciences (abbr.: к. филос. н.);
 physico-mathematical sciences (abbr.: к. ф.-м. н.);
 political sciences (abbr.: к. полит. н.);
 psychological sciences (abbr.: к. пс. н.);
 sociological sciences (abbr.: к. соц. н.);
 theology (abbr.: к. богосл.);
 veterinary sciences (abbr.: к. ветеринар. н.).

Previously, there was also the degree of "naval sciences" (abbr.: к. воен.-мор. н.). For some time (in the 1940s) there was also the degree of "candidate of art criticism sciences" (abbr.: к. иск. н.).
	
Some specialties permit the award of the candidate degree for several variants of branches of science, depending on the dominant subject area of the dissertation; e. g., specialty 02.00.04 (physical chemistry) can be awarded the degree of candidate of physico-mathematical, technical, or chemical sciences. However, for each dissertation only one branch of science can be chosen.

See also
 Doctor of Philosophy
 Doktor nauk
 Education in Belarus
 Education in Russia
 Education in Ukraine

References

Doctoral degrees
Education in Russia
Education in the Soviet Union